The Central Wisconsin State Fair is a state fair held annually in Marshfield, Wisconsin. The Central Wisconsin State Fair Round Barn on the fairgrounds has been listed in the National Register of Historic Places since 1997.  The fair should not be confused with the Wisconsin Valley Fair.

See also
Northern Wisconsin State Fair
Wisconsin State Fair

References
Central Wisconsin State Fair website
Central Wisconsin State Fairgrounds, Round Barn, City of Marshfield.

Wisconsin State Fair - Northern
Wisconsin State Fair - Northern
Tourist attractions in Wood County, Wisconsin
Tourist attractions in Marathon County, Wisconsin
Traveling carnivals